Christine McHorse (December 21, 1948 – February 17, 2021), also known as Christine Nofchissey McHorse, was a Navajo ceramic artist from Santa Fe, New Mexico.

Early life and education
Born Christine Nofchissey on December 21, 1949, in Morenci, Arizona, she was the fifth of nine children of Mark and Ethel Yazzie Nofchissey. McHorse lived off reservation in her childhood but spent summers in Fluted Rock, Arizona, herding sheep and learning about Navajo oral history from her grandmother, Zonith Bahe.

At age 14, McHorse was introduced to Picasso, Gaudi and Matisse at her boarding school, and she said these artists "opened a whole new world to us" (referring to herself and older sisters who were also attending the school).

From 1963 to 1968, she studied at the Institute of American Indian Arts (IAIA) in Santa Fe, New Mexico, when it was a high school for the arts on the campus of the Santa Fe Indian School. Originally intending to study glassblowing, she chose to study ceramics when the glassblowing major was discontinued the year she arrived, studying with Ralph Pardington (ceramics), Charles Loloma (jewelry), Allan Houser (foundry arts) and Fritz Scholder (design). She met her future husband Joel P. McHorse at IAIA and was influenced by her future grandmother-in-law, Lena Archuleta of Taos Pueblo, to begin working with ceramics.

Archuleta inspired and instructed McHorse in using the shimmering micaceous clay that was common to the Taos area, and McHorse continued to use that clay in her work.

Personal life
In 1969 McHorse married Joel P. McHorse, a Taos Pueblo Indian and fellow art student whom she met at the Institute of American Indian Arts (IAIA). They had two children, Joel Christopher and Jonathan Thomas, originally living in Taos but later moving to Santa Fe.

McHorse died from complications of COVID-19 in Santa Fe on February 17, 2021, during the COVID-19 pandemic in New Mexico. She was 72 years old.

Artwork and recognition 
McHorse's artwork draws inspiration from Navajo, Pueblo, and Anglo cultures. McHorse's pottery was created with a traditional coil-building method and she based her work on traditional Navajo designs and legends, influenced by the Pueblo artistry but her work is nontraditional in appearance.

Much of her work has a signature black surface, created by depriving the clay of oxygen during firing and making her creations popular in contemporary art venues. She preferred to do the firing in the traditional mode but used the electric kiln for pre-firing larger pieces, some up to two feet, to prevent the chance of breakage. She used cedarwood and cottonwood bark as fuel for her outdoor firing. Although commonly Navajo potters have applied boiled pinon-pine pitch to the surface of fired pots to make them waterproof, McHorse used the pitch to increase value contrast in her incised designs.

Her large pottery has the sound of glass when tapped.

McHorse exhibited at Santa Fe Indian Market for 23 years, winning 38 awards for both pottery and sculpture. Her work can be found in the permanent collections of the Heard Museum, the Denver Art Museum, the National Museum of the American Indian, Navajo Nation Museum, and more. McHorse's work is also featured in the catalog Dark Light: The Ceramics of Christine Nofchissey McHorse (Fresco Fine Art Publications).

Selected awards 
 1985: Denver Annual Pottery Show, first prize 
 1990: Museum of Northern Arizona's Navajo Craftsmen Exhibition, Best of Show
 1994: Santa Fe Indian Market (SFIM), Best in Division, 1994
 1994, 1987, and 1989: Gallup Inter-Tribal Indian Ceremonial, Gallup, New Mexico, first place,
 2001: SFIM Best of Classification Award in sculpture, 2001
 2006: SFIM Challenge Award
 2012: SFIM Best Sculpture – first time the award had been won by a potter rather than a sculptor

Solo exhibitions 
 1993: Andrea Fisher Fine Pottery, Santa Fe, NM
 2013–2017: Dark Light: The Ceramics of Christine Nofchissey McHorse, traveling exhibition organized by the CFile Foundation, Nerman Museum of Contemporary Art (2013), Houston Center for Contemporary Craft (2014), Fred Jones Jr. Museum of Art (2014), Navajo Nation Museum, Rockwell Museum of Western Art, IAIA Museum of Contemporary Native Arts (2015), Arizona State Museum (2016), National Museum of the American Indian (2017)

Group exhibitions 
 1972: Taos Pueblo Arts and Crafts Shop, New Mexico (through 1977)
 1983: Brigham Young University, Provo, Utah
 1985: Eileen Kremen Gallery, Fullerton, California
 1985: Eight Northern Artist and Craft Show, San Ildefonso Pueblo, New Mexico
 1987: Kornbluth Gallery, Fair Lawn, New York
 1988: anii ánáádaalyaa'íí: Continuity and Innovation in Recent Navajo Art, Wheelwright Museum of the American Indian, Santa Fe, New Mexico
 1989: Navajo Pottery, Southwest Museum, Los Angeles, California
 1989: Scripps 45th Ceramics Annual, Lang Art Gallery, Scripps College, Claremont, California
 1989: From this Earth: Pottery of the Southwest, Museum of Indian Arts and Culture, Museum of New Mexico, Santa Fe
 1990: The Cutting Edge, traveling exhibit organized by the Museum of American Folk Art, New York; Venues: New Britain Museum of American Art, New Britain, Connecticut; Laguna Art Museum, Laguna Beach, California; Telfair Museum, Savannah, Georgia; Tampa Museum of Art, Tampa, Florida; Whatcom Museum, Bellingham, Washington
 1994: Honoring the Legacy, Museum of Northern Arizona, Flagstaff
 1994: Diversity of Expression: New Mexico Folk Art, New Mexico State Capitol/Governor's Gallery, Santa Fe
 1994: Contemporary Art of the Navajo Nation, traveling exhibit organized by Cedar Rapids (Iowa) Museum of Art; Venues: Albuquerque Museum, Albuquerque, New Mexico; University Art Museum, State University of New York, Albany, New York; Museum of the Southwest, Midland, Texas
 1996: Contemporary Women Artists of the West, 1946–1996, Karan Ruhlen Gallery, Santa Fe, New Mexico
 2019: Hearts of Our People: Native Women Artists, Minneapolis Institute of Art, Minneapolis, MN

Public collections 
 Denver Museum of Natural History, Colorado
 Museum of Indian Arts & Culture, Santa Fe, New Mexico
 Museum of New Mexico, Santa Fe
 Navajo Nation Museum, Window Rock, Arizona
 School for Advanced Research, Santa Fe

Further reading 
Books
 Navajo Pottery: Traditions and Innovations, by Russell P. Hartman, Northland Press, Flagstaff, 1987
 Beyond Tradition, Contemporary Indian Art and Its Evolution by Lois Essary Jacka, Northland Publishing Co., Flagstaff, 1988
 anii ánáádaalyaa'íí: Continuity and Innovation in Recent Navajo Art, exhibition catalog by Bruce Bernstein and Susan McGreevy, Wheelwright Museum, Santa Fe, 1988
 Museum of American Folk Art Encyclopedia of Twentieth-Century American Folk Art and Artists by Chuck and Jan Rosenak, New York, 1990
 The People Speak: Navajo Folk Art by Chuck and Jan Rosenak, Northland Publishing Co., Flagstaff, 1994
 Enduring Traditions, Art of the Navajo by Lois Essary Jacka, Northland Publishing Co., Flagstaff, 1994
 Contemporary American Folk Art: A Collector's Guide, by Chuck and Jan Rosenak, New York, 1996.

Articles
 New York Times, 17 March 1985
 interview with Rebecca Friedman, THE Magazine, November 1994
 "The 'Gold Pots' Stand Out in Elegant Beauty," by Dottie Indyke, Santa Fe New Mexican's Pasatiempo, 2 June 1995
 "Meet the Masters," by Michael Hice, Indian Artist Magazine, Spring 1996
 "Mother Earth's Shining Gift," by Melinda Elliott, New Mexico Magazine vol. 74, no. 7, August 1996.

References 

People from Morenci, Arizona
1948 births
2021 deaths
20th-century ceramists
20th-century American artists
20th-century American women artists
21st-century ceramists
21st-century American artists
21st-century American women artists
American ceramists
American contemporary artists
American women ceramists
Artists from Arizona
Deaths from the COVID-19 pandemic in New Mexico
Institute of American Indian Arts alumni
Native American potters
Native American women artists
Navajo artists